The Bakhmut uezd was one of the subdivisions of the Yekaterinoslav Governorate of the Russian Empire. It was situated in the eastern part of the governorate. Its administrative centre was Bakhmut.

Demographics
At the time of the Russian Empire Census of 1897, Bakhmutsky Uyezd had a population of 332,478. Of these, 58.2% spoke Ukrainian, 31.2% Russian, 3.8% German, 2.8% Yiddish, 1.9% Moldovan or Romanian, 0.7% Belarusian, 0.6% Polish, 0.1% French, 0.1% Tatar, 0.1% English, 0.1% Armenian and 0.1% Romani as their native language.

References

 
Uyezds of Yekaterinoslav Governorate
Yekaterinoslav Governorate